The Subaru B5-TPH was a concept shooting-brake coupe with a Turbo Parallel Hybrid (TPH) powertrain made by Fuji Heavy Industries (FHI), introduced at the 2005 Tokyo Motor Show.

Design

The concept behind the B5-TPH was to design a car "for long-weekend [getaways] for couples." Contemporary news articles were generally supportive of the new design direction, which anonymous sources claimed would be used in a forthcoming Impreza. Subaru stated the next Impreza would not be based on the B5-TPH's styling, and that they would launch a hybrid vehicle based on the B5-TPH powertrain in Japan by 2007.

Technical

The TPH drivetrain featured an electric motor-generator sandwiched between the gasoline motor, which used the Miller cycle, and the automatic transmission. The B5-TPH used manganese lithium-ion batteries.

The TPH system was developed with the intent of mass production. Subaru's prior concept hybrid, the B9 Scrambler, featured a Sequential Series Hybrid Electric Vehicle (SSHEV) powertrain. The newer TPH system was more cost-effective because it used a more compact electric motor and battery.

The batteries were developed by NEC Lamilion Energy, Ltd., which had been co-founded in 2002 by NEC and FHI to develop a lithium-ion capacitor which promised better energy density and durability compared to normal storage batteries. NEC Lamilion was later absorbed into Automotive Energy Supply Corporation, who would go on to supply the lithium-ion battery pack for the Nissan Leaf electric vehicle.

References

External links

 

B5-TPH
Cars introduced in 2005
Coupés